Coulsdon South railway station serves Coulsdon in the London Borough of Croydon, and is in Travelcard Zone 6, on the Brighton Main Line. The station is served by Southern and by ThamesLink. It is the most southerly mainline station in London.

History 

Coulsdon is on a stretch of line between Croydon and Redhill which the UK Parliament insisted should be shared by the London and Brighton Railway (L&BR) route to Brighton, and the South Eastern Railway (SER) route to Dover. As a result, there have been a number of railway stations at Coulsdon.

Coulsdon South

This station was opened by the South Eastern Railway (SER) on 1 October 1889. The line is on a steep gradient climbing towards Merstham Tunnel. It was originally called Coulsdon and Cane Hill, referring to the nearby psychiatric hospital: a covered way connected the station to the hospital. By the 1960s, the covered way had been removed.

Ticketing
The station remains staffed for most of the operational day, with a booking office located on the up (west) side of the station. At the entrance to the ticket office from the station approach road, there are two self-service ticket machines, one of which, most unusually, is wall-mounted.
  
A PERTIS self-service 'Permit to Travel' ticket machine was previously provided here but has been removed. Automatic Ticket Barriers were installed at the station in spring 2011

Other stations in Coulsdon
Stoats Nest for Coulsdon and Cane Hill (later Coulsdon North) was opened on 8 November 1899, by the LB&SCR on their Quarry Line which bypassed Redhill. It closed 3 October 1983.
 Smitham (later Coulsdon Town) was opened in 1904 by the SER on their Tattenham Corner Line and is named after another nearby settlement. This station was renamed from Smitham in 2011 as part of Southern Railway's new franchise agreement. This change was made as a result of a local consultation carried out by Croydon Council and it intended to better reflect the location of the station near Coulsdon town centre.

Recent history
In May 2019, work began to install a new accessible footbridge with lifts and tactile paving. The work was completed in August 2020 having been delayed due to the coronavirus pandemic.

Services 

Services at Coulsdon South are operated by Southern and Thameslink using  and  EMUs.

The typical off-peak service in trains per hour is:
 2 tph to 
 2 tph to  via 
 2 tph to 
 2 tph to  via 

On Sundays, the service between London and Reigate reduces to hourly. In addition, the Peterborough to Horsham service also reduces to hourly and northbound, runs only as far as London Bridge

Connections
London Buses routes 60, 404, 405, 463 and night route N68 serve the station.

Trivia
David Bowie's schizophrenic half-brother Terry, died by suicide on 16 January 1985 when he walked in front of a train at Coulsdon South railway station.

Notes and references

External links 

Stoats Nest for Coulsdon and Cane Hill – with photograph of that name and other names used by Coulsdon North
Coulsdon and Cane Hill – with photograph of the name

Railway stations in the London Borough of Croydon
Former South Eastern Railway (UK) stations
Railway stations in Great Britain opened in 1889
Railway stations served by Govia Thameslink Railway